The North American FJ-2 and FJ-3 Fury are a series of swept-wing carrier-capable fighters for the United States Navy and Marine Corps. The FJ-2 resulted from an effort to navalize the North American F-86 Sabre operated by the United States Air Force. These aircraft feature folding wings, and a longer nose landing strut designed to increase angle of attack upon launch and to accommodate a longer oleo to absorb the shock of hard landings on an aircraft carrier deck.

Although sharing a U.S. Navy designation with its distant predecessor, the straight-winged North American FJ-1 Fury, the FJ-2/-3 were completely different aircraft. (The later FJ-4 was again, a complete structural redesign of the FJ-3). The FJ-2 was one of the aircraft used to evaluate the first steam catapult on a US Navy aircraft-carrier.

Design and development

FJ-2
By 1951, the Navy's existing straight-wing fighters were inferior in performance to the swept-wing Soviet Mikoyan-Gurevich MiG-15 then operating in the Korean War; the swept-wing fighters in the Navy's development pipeline, such as the Vought F7U Cutlass and Grumman F9F Cougar, were not yet ready for deployment.

As an interim measure, the Navy's Bureau of Aeronautics ordered a direct development of the swept-wing North American F-86E Sabres as the FJ-2. As the F-86 had not been designed to be carrier-capable, this involved some risk, but Navy pilots had observed that the F-86A actually had a lower landing speed than the Grumman F9F Panther. During carrier qualification trials the Navy informed Grumman that if the F9F-5 stall speed was not reduced by  it would be removed from carrier operations at the same time that the FJ-2 was already making its debut into navy squadrons. North American's chief engineer at the time stated that the swept-wing Sabre had handling and stall characteristics at low speeds comparable to the best straight winged airplanes.  The urgency behind the program was such that 300 (later reduced to 200) FJ-2 fighters were ordered before the prototypes had flown.

The first prototype to fly was actually the third aircraft ordered: Designated XFJ-2B and first flown on 27 December 1951, it differed only from a standard F-86E-10 in its armament, having four  Colt Mk 12 cannons instead of the six Colt-Browning M3  machine guns of the Sabre. The second and third aircraft to fly were designated XFJ-2 and lacked armament, but were modified to be carrier-capable. They had arrester hooks and longer nosewheel legs to increase angle of attack at take-off and landing, and catapult fittings. Results were less than satisfactory: Low-speed handling was poor, while the arrester hook and nose gear leg weren't strong enough.

The first production aircraft flew on 22 November 1952. This FJ-2 incorporated further modifications for carrier operations: The track of the main landing gear was widened by eight inches, the outer wing panels folded upward, and the windscreen was modified to give the pilot a better view during approach. The FJ-2 also featured an all-moving "flying tail" without dihedral. Because of problems experienced during launches with steam catapults, a number of FJ-2 later received a stronger nosewheel strut. Outwardly, the FJ-2 was hard to distinguish from an F-86, apart from navy paint and the gun muzzles of the  cannons. The engine was the General Electric J47-GE-2, a navalized version of the J47-GE-27 used in the F-86F. A decision had already been made to give it to land-based squadrons of the US Marine Corps.

Construction was slowed due to demand for the F-86 in Korea; the FJ-2 was not produced in large numbers until after that conflict had concluded. Only seven aircraft had been delivered by the end of 1953, and it was January 1954 before the first aircraft was delivered to a Marine squadron, VMF-122. The Navy preferred the lighter F9F Cougar due to its superior slow-speed performance for carrier operations, and the 200 FJ-2 models built were delivered to the United States Marine Corps. The Marines did make several cruises aboard carriers and tried to solve the type's carrier handling problems, but the FJ-2 was never really satisfactory. In 1956, the FJ-2 already disappeared from front-line service, and reserve units retired it in 1957.

FJ-3

Even while development of the FJ-2 was ongoing, the development was planned of a version powered by the Wright J65, a license-built version of the British Armstrong Siddeley Sapphire turbojet. The Sapphire promised to deliver 28% more thrust than the J47, for little gain in weight. The new version was designated FJ-3, and an order for 389 aircraft was placed in March 1952.

To test the new engine a single FJ-2, BuNo 131931, was modified, but the first true production FJ-3 flew on 3 July 1953. The only externally visible change required by the new engine was a deeper intake to accommodate the larger mass flow. This modification, first introduced on the F-86F, enhanced maneuverability at the expense of a small increase in landing speed due to deletion of the leading edge slats. The version introduced on the FJ-3 was different from that fitted to the F-86F, as camber was applied to the underside of the leading edge to improve low-speed handling. On the FJ-3, the new wing leading edges also held extra fuel.

Deliveries began in September 1954, and the FJ-3 joined the fleet in May 1955. An FJ-3 was the first fighter to land aboard the new supercarrier  in 1956. Problems were encountered with the J65 engine, including failures of its lubrication system under the acceleration of launch or during manoeuvres, and failures of the turbine blades. Nevertheless, the Navy was more satisfied with the FJ-3 than it had been with the FJ-2, and in March 1954 ordered an additional 149 aircraft. Because of its more powerful engine, the FJ-3 was superior to most models of the F-86, except the F-86H. A total of 538 FJ-3s were built. Of these 194 were modified to FJ-3Ms with the ability to carry AIM-9 Sidewinder air-to-air missiles. Some FJ-3s were later modified to control Regulus missiles (KDU-1), and Grumman F9F-6K Cougar target drones. In 1956 the Navy retro-fitted all its FJ-3s with probe-and-drogue air refueling equipment, a long probe being fitted under the left wing.

Variants

XFJ-2 Test and evaluation aircraft; three built.
FJ-2 Fury Single-seat fighter-bomber aircraft, equipped with folding wings; powered by one General Electric J47-GE-2 turbojet; 200 built.
FJ-3 Fury (after 1962 F-1C) Single-seat fighter-bomber version, powered by the more powerful  Wright J65-W-2 or  J65-W-4 turbojet engine; 538 built.
FJ-3M Fury (after 1962 MF-1C) Improved version of the FJ-3, with the ability to carry AIM-9 Sidewinder air-to-air missiles; 194 FJ-3 converted to this standard.
FJ-3D (after 1962 DF-1C) conversions to control aircraft for SSM-N-8 Regulus missiles and KDU target drones.
FJ-3D2 (after 1962 DF-1D) conversions to control aircraft for Grumman F9F-6K Cougar target drones.

Operators

 United States Navy
 United States Marine Corps

Aircraft on display
FJ-2
BuNo 132023 – National Naval Aviation Museum, NAS Pensacola, Florida.
BuNo 132057 – USS Hornet Museum, Alameda, California.
FJ-3
BuNo 135841 – Marine Corps Air Station Beaufort, South Carolina.
BuNo 135867 – Planes of Fame Museum in Chino, California.
BuNo 135868 – Intrepid Sea, Air & Space Museum in New York, New York.
BuNo 135883 – USS Midway Museum in San Diego, California.
BuNo 136032 – Middleton Field in Evergreen, Alabama.

FJ-3M
BuNo 141393 – Hickory Aviation Museum in Hickory, North Carolina.

Specifications (FJ-2)

See also

References

Notes

Bibliography

 Angelucci, Enzo, The American Fighter: The Definitive Guide to American Fighter Aircraft From 1917 to the Present, New York: Orion Books, 1987. .
 Avery, Norm. North American Aircraft 1934–1998, Volume 1. Santa Ana, California: Narkiewicz//Thompson, 1998. .
 Bowers, Peter M. United States Navy Aircraft since 1911. Annapolis, Maryland: Naval Institute Press, 1990, pp. 385–388. .
 Bowman, Martin. F-86 Sabre. Westport, Connecticut: Airlife, 2004. .
 Dorr, Robert F. "Fury: The Navy's Sabre". Air International, January 1993.
 Dorr, Robert F. "North American FJ Fury". Aeroplane Monthly, February 2006.
 Kinzey, Bert. FJ Fury (Detail & Scale Vol. 68). Carollton, Texas: Squadron Signal Books, 2003. .
 Taylor, John, W.R., ed. Jane's All the World's Aircraft 1965–1966. London: Jane's All the World's Aircraft, 1967. .
 Wagner, Ray. The North American Sabre. London: Macdonald, 1963. No ISBN.
 Wilson, Stewart. Combat Aircraft since 1945. Fyshwick, ACT, Australia: Aerospace Publications Pty Ltd, 2000. .
 Wilson, Stewart. F-86 Sabre / MiG-15 Fagot / Hawker Hunter. Fyshwick ACT, Australia: Aerospace Publications Pty Ltd, 1995. .
 Winchester, Jim, ed. North American FJ Fury. Military Aircraft of the Cold War (The Aviation Factfile). London: Grange Books plc, 2006. .

External links

F01J-2
1950s United States fighter aircraft
Single-engined jet aircraft
Low-wing aircraft
Carrier-based aircraft
FJ-2 Fury
Aircraft first flown in 1951